Acastopyge is a genus of trilobite in the order Phacopida, which existed in what is now Poland. It was named by E. Tomczykowa in 1974, and the type species is Acastopyge shergoldi.

References

External links
 Acastopyge at the Paleobiology Database

Fossils of Poland
Acastidae